Andy Kyle may refer to:

 Andy Kyle (1910s outfielder) (1889–1971), Canadian Major League Baseball outfielder and National Hockey Association defenseman
 Andy Kyle (1920s outfielder) (?–?), American Negro league outfielder

See also
 Andrew Kyle (born 1978), Northern Irish international lawn and indoor bowler